Bouni may refer to:
 Bouni language, a language of Tanzania
 Bouni, Comoros, a village in the Comoros
 , a village in Bourasso Department, Burkina Faso
 , a village in Guéguéré Department, Burkina Faso

See also 
 
 Boune (disambiguation)